is a 1978 Japanese anthology film directed by Tsugunobu Kotani and starring the J-pop duo Pink Lady.

Plot
Mie and Kei, best known as the Japanese pop duo Pink Lady, are in New York City in the middle of their U.S. tour when they are asked by the press about their upcoming motion picture debut. Meanwhile, in Tokyo, film producer Senkichi Shirakawa, director Shinpei Akazawa, and screenwriter Hiroshi Aota discuss ideas on what kind of movie they should make for the duo. Aota wants a romantic melodrama, while Shirakawa suggests a science fiction film with monsters, and Akazawa pitches a western film.

Nurse Kei is offered by her elderly patient Shizue Tanaka to marry her son Takayuki, who has a successful career in a prestigious company. At the same time, Kei's sister Mie is in a relationship with a bartender named Hattori, which Kei disapproves. The duo then arranges for a double date, but Kei is summoned at the last minute to tend to a head injury victim named Sugimoto, resulting in a fight between the two sisters after work. The next day, Kei goes to the bar to apologize to Hattori, only to discover that Takayuki and Hattori are the same person, as Takayuki confesses that he was forced to take up bartending after his company went bankrupt. To ensure that Mie stays happy with Takayuki, Kei has Sugimoto set up as her boyfriend. Kei offers Sugimoto money as a token of gratitude, but he refuses, telling her she will eventually find the right man.

At a local circus, Mie and Kei are assigned to handle a large pink monster they nickname "Mon-chan". Feeling remorse for Mon-chan when the ringmaster and trainers physically abuse it, the duo frees it from its cage and run off with it to the forest. While being chased by the ringmaster, Mie, Kei, and Mon-chan end up near Mount Fuji, where they are beamed aboard a UFO. Mon-chan is reunited with its parents as the UFO heads back to their home planet, but Mie and Kei wish to return to Earth. The aliens attempt to beam the duo back to Earth, but a mishap causes them to turn invisible. Upon their return, Mie and Kei use their invisibility to fight crime in Tokyo.

Mie and Kei are entertainers at a Texas saloon called "Western Town" when they are harassed by a gang of bandits led by Garlic. A lone hero named Sugar Brown intervenes and kills two of Garlic's henchmen during the shootout before he is wounded and forced to retreat. Because of this, Garlic has Sheriff Pepper place Sugar on the wanted list. Kei is in love with Sugar, but he tells her he must leave town to ensure the safety of her and Mie. The next night, while the duo performs at the saloon, the gang spots a disguised Sugar and prepares to kill him when Kei sacrifices herself to take a bullet for him. Sugar takes out two bandits, but a third one shoots him in the back. Sheriff Pepper arrives at the scene and with the help of Mie, kills Garlic in the shootout.

The next day, a grieving Mie sobs at the graves of Sugar and Kei. Sheriff Pepper attempts to console her, but she will not forgive him for not saving Kei. Suddenly, a UFO appears in the scene at the insistence of Shirakawa, forcing Akazawa to break character and attack Shirakawa and Aota.

Back in New York, Mie and Kei receive a phone call from Shirakawa, who asks them which of the three stories they want to do, unaware of the chaos in the production office from the in-fighting. The duo decides to do all three stories for their film before Kei drops the telephone receiver in the bathtub, spraying water in Shirakawa's face.

Cast
 Mitsuyo Nemoto as 
 Keiko Masuda as 
 Tetsuo Ishidate as 
 Taisaku Akino as 
 Ken Tanaka as 
 Masumi Harukawa as 
 Osami Nabe as 
 Iwao Dan as 
 Bill Ross as the 
 Gajirō Satō as 
 Kibaji Tankobo as 
 Hachirō Misumi as the 
 Masao Komatsu as the 
 The Handers as the 
 Fujita Okamoto as 
 Hiroshi Tanaka as 
 Toby Kadoguchi as 
 Eitarō Matsuyama as a 
 Reiko Itsuki as

Soundtrack

The soundtrack album was released on December 25, 1978, one week after the film's premiere. It features shortened versions of the duo's first 10 hit singles from 1976 to 1978. The 2006 CD release features dialogue tracks from the film.

Track listing 
All tracks composed by Shunichi Tokura, lyrics written by Yū Aku, except where indicated.

*CD bonus tracks

Charts

Home media
The film was released on DVD on July 28, 2006 to commemorate the 30th anniversary of Pink Lady.

References

External links
 (soundtrack)

Pink Lady no Katsudō Daishashin at AllCinema
Pink Lady no Katsudō Daishashin at Kinenote

1978 films
1978 compilation albums
1978 soundtrack albums
1978 comedy-drama films
1970s Japanese films
1970s musical comedy-drama films
1970s romantic comedy-drama films
1970s science fiction films
1978 Western (genre) films
Films about musical groups
Films set in New York City
Films set in Shizuoka Prefecture
Films set in Texas
Films set in Tokyo
Japanese anthology films
Japanese musical comedy-drama films
Japanese romantic comedy-drama films
Japanese Western (genre) films
1970s Japanese-language films
Pink Lady (band) compilation albums
Toho films
Victor Entertainment compilation albums
1978 drama films